Taylor Lee Lynch (born January 22, 1997) is an American softball player. She attended Red Oak High School in Red Oak, Texas. She later attended Oklahoma State University–Stillwater, where she played on the Oklahoma State Cowgirls softball team. In her senior year, Lynch played the entire season with a torn ACL in her right knee, while she led the Cowgirls to a berth in the 2019 Women's College World Series second round, where they lost to Washington, 1–0.

References

External links
 
Oklahoma State bio

1997 births
American softball players
Oklahoma State Cowgirls softball players
Living people
People from Ellis County, Texas